Athletes from the Netherlands competed at the 1952 Winter Olympics in Oslo, Norway.

Medalists

Alpine skiing

Men

Women

Figure skating

Women

Speed skating

Men

References

Olympic Winter Games 1952, full results by sports-reference.com

Nations at the 1952 Winter Olympics
1952
Olympics